Conchata may refer to

Conchata Ferrell (1943–2020), American actress
Tinissa conchata, a moth of the family Tineidae